A Bride of the Plains is a historical novel written in 1915 by Baroness Orczy, the author of the famous The Scarlet Pimpernel series. It is dedicated to the memory of Lajos Kossuth, and in the dedication the author cries out to the dead Hungarian patriot and asks him:

"What would YOU have said now had vou lived to see your country tied to Austria’s chariot-wheels, the catspaw and tool of the Teutonic race which you abhorred?"

Plot summary
The story is set in Hungary and the scene is laid in a village close to the Maros. 
The sharp, cracked sound of the Elevation bell breaks the silence of the summer morning. The good Pater Bonifacius is saying Mass: he, at any rate, is astir and busy with his day’s work and obligations. Surely it is strange that at so late an hour in mid-September, with the maize waiting to be gathered in, the population of Marosfalva should be still absent from the fields! Hej ! But, stranger, what would you ? Such a day is-this Fourteenth of September. What ? You did not know it? The Fourteenth of September, the ugliest, blackest, most God forsaken day in the whole year! What kind of a stranger are you if you do not know that?

On this hideous day all the finest lads in the village are taken away to be made into soldiers by the abominable Government? Three years! Why, the lad is a mere child when he goes-one-and-twenty on his last birthday, bless him! still wanting a mother’s care of his stomach, and a father’s heavy stick across his back from time to time to keep him from too much love-making.

Three years ! When he comes back he is a man and has notions of his own. Three years! What are the chances he comes back at all? Bosnia! Where in the world is that? My God, how they hate it! They must go through with it, though they hate it all-every moment. They hate to be packed into railway carriages like so many dried heads of maize in a barn... and the rude alien sergeant with his 'Vorwarts!' and 'Marsch!' and 'Rechts!' and 'Links!' I ask you in the name of the Holy Virgin what kind of gibberish is that?

On this particular fourteenth of September it is Andor's turn due to go. On the eve preceding it, at the village merrymaking, as the whole population spends its last happy hours trying to forget the hideous events that will occur in the morning, he tokens himself to Elsa the village beauty.

It is Elsa and Andor that everyone is watching. He is tall and broad-shouldered with the supple limbs of a young stag, and the mad irresponsible movements of a young colt. The young couple dread the next day, which comes all too soon. They are at the station now, the last bell has sounded. For each lad only one girl, and there she is at the foot of the carriage steps, a corner of her ribbon, or handkerchief or cotton petticoat stuffed into her mouth to prevent herself from bursting into sobs. The pain and loss of conscription.

It is some time since Andor was conscripted but there has been no news of him so Elsa is forced to betroth herself to the wealthy and sinister Béla, after being placed in the terrible alternative of either being faithless to Andor or disobedient to her mother. It is characteristic of Hungarian society at the time that of the two options available the latter seemed by far the more heinous.

On the eve of Elsa's wedding Andor suddenly reappears, and is indirectly concerned in the assassination of Béla which takes place the same night.

The story begins and ends with festival mingled with tragedy.

1915 British novels
Historical novels
Novels by Baroness Emma Orczy
Novels set in Hungary
Hutchinson (publisher) books